Civera is a surname. Notable people with the surname include:

David Civera (born 1979), Spanish singer
Mario Civera (born 1946), American politician
Victoria Civera (born 1955), Spanish-born artist